Maria Beccadelli di Bologna, Marchesa di Altavilla, Principessa di Camporeale (6 February 1848, Naples – 20 January 1929, Rome), married Princess Maria von Bülow, was first married to Count Karl von Dönhoff  they later got divorced and she became the wife of Prince Bernhard von Bülow, the Chancellor of Germany.

She was the daughter of Domenico Beccadelli di Bologna (1826–1863), Principe di Camporeale, and Laura, née Acton. Her mother was married in second marriage to the Italian prime minister Marco Minghetti and played a central role in Italian and German aristocracy. Maria began calling herself Marie after her marriage to the Prussian diplomat Karl August, Count of Dönhoff. They married on 15 May 1867 in Lugano, but were divorced in 1882 and the marriage annulled by the Pope in 1884. On 9 January 1886 in Vienna, she married Bernhard, Prince of Bülow, later Chancellor of the German Empire. She became a confidant of the Prussian Crown Princess Victoria.

References

External links
 

Italian nobility
German princesses
Spouses of chancellors of Germany
19th-century Neapolitan people
1848 births
1929 deaths
Italian salon-holders